Iva Lee Marie Tansey (January 6, 1930 – March 10, 2016) was a member of the Ohio House of Representatives.

External links
Profile on the Ohio Ladies' Gallery website

References

1930 births
Republican Party members of the Ohio House of Representatives
Women state legislators in Ohio
2016 deaths
21st-century American women